Broth Soup is a 2000 Iranian film written and directed by Hossein Shahabi (Persian: حسین شهابی)

Starring
 Ali Piroozi
 Rahman Ghorbani
 Hashem Saeedi
 Nader Golrokh
 Sadegh Sharifian
 Ahmad Abbasi

Cast
 producer: Kobra Ghasemi
 Production manager: Mnsour Sharifian
 cinematography: Kazem Srvar
 Sound Recorder: Ali Kohzad
 Costume Designer: Fariba Mortazavi
 Make Up: Sanaz Shahin
 Music: Hossein Shahabi 
 Production: Kish TV

References

1997 films
Iranian drama films
Films directed by Hossein Shahabi